Brian Dannelly is a German born American film director and screenwriter best known for his work on the 2004 film Saved!

Early life
Dannelly was born in Würzburg, Germany before moving with his family to Baltimore, Maryland aged eleven. He was raised Catholic; he attended a Catholic elementary school, Arlington Baptist High School in Baltimore, and a Jewish summer camp. He was expelled from first grade for hitting a nun, and later expelled from high school—which he describes as "one of the strictest schools in the nation"—for excessive demerits. He started questioning his sexuality in high school, claiming, "I remember I'd pray every night that I wasn't gay, and please God, please God, anything I could do—just don't make this happen." He came out at the age of seventeen and was thrown out of his house by his parents, who eventually came to accept his sexuality.

Dannelly graduated from the University of Maryland, Baltimore County with a degree in visual arts in 1997.

Career
Dannelly wrote and directed short film "He Bop" in 2000 before his debut with 2004's religious satire film Saved!, which he directed and co-wrote with Michael Urban. He had begun to write the Saved! script after the Columbine High School massacre in 1999, which he claims took him "back to [his] roots" in a Christian high school. He and Urban began writing the script while attending the American Film Institute Conservatory. Much of the story was drawn from his own experiences with "conservative Christian subculture", including Christian rock concerts, being "this gay kid in a Christian school" and having visions of Jesus. He says, "In the Baptist school there was the one Jewish girl that everyone was trying to save, there was a girl who got pregnant, there was a gay kid"—all principal characters in Saved! He claims that nothing in the film came from his imagination: "Everything in the movie comes from either something I experienced, or something I witnessed, or something I researched."

After Saved! was released, Dannelly went on to become a regular series director on the television show Weeds. He has also directed the 2006 pilot episode of Help Me Help You and Pushing Daisies' 2007 episode "Corpsicle". His most recent film, Runner Up, about a beauty pageant queen who organizes a pageant in a women's prison, is currently in production. He is signed on to direct upcoming romantic comedy film The Guided Man, which he co-wrote with Michael Urban and Steve Adams based on a 1952 story by L. Sprague de Camp. He has written a spec script, Army Geek, about a Texan Napoleon Dynamite-like character who joins the military.

In 2017, Dannelly worked as a director on two episodes of the second season of the Netflix original series Haters Back Off, starring Colleen Ballinger (Miranda Sings), Angela Kinsey and Erik Stocklin.

References

External links

Year of birth missing (living people)
Living people
American film directors
American male screenwriters
American television producers
American television directors
American gay writers
LGBT film directors
German gay writers
LGBT people from Maryland
Film directors from Würzburg
University of Maryland, Baltimore County alumni
21st-century LGBT people
German male screenwriters
American LGBT screenwriters